Georges Cadoudal (6 July 1929 – 13 June 2021) was a French sonneur and musician. Alongside , he formed a group of sonneurs dedicated to the revival of Breton music after World War II.

Biography
Cadoudal was born into a family of musicians in Magoar. He played the bombard alongside his father, who was a talabarder during the turmoil of World War II.

In 1946, Cadoudal founded Kevrenn Rostrenn, one of the first bagads. It was composed of two binioù bras, a few bombards, and a clarinet. Following this event, Cadoudal was able to broaden his repertoire and improve his bombard technique. The following year, he participated in the creation of a Celtic circle in Bourbriac.

In the early 1950s, Cadoudal met Rivoallan and the two began a period of close collaboration. Cadoudal taught Rivoallan how to play the bombard and they participated in a Fest Noz, leading to the creation of the Bagad Bourbriac in 1953. During collection sessions, the two met Marie-Josèphe Bertrand and the Frères Morvan in 1958. Following Rivoallan's accidental death in 1961, Cadoudal won that year's Bagadoù National Championship alongside Daniel Philippe.

In 1966, Cadoudal created the  competition in Rostrenen. In 1994, he created the group Re an Are. He settled down and became a sheep breeder in Brennilis, but continued to follow the Breton musical scene closely. He also advocated for peasant agriculture and fought against environmental struggles, founding the Association Bevañ e Menez Are.

Alan Stivell claimed "to have been marked by the influence of Etienne Rivoallan and Georges Cadoudal". In August 2018, Stivell awarded Cadoudal the collar of the Order of the Ermine.

Georges Cadoudal died in Carhaix-Plouguer on 13 June 2021 at the age of 91.

Discography

With Étienne Rivoallan
En passant par la Bretagne n°4 (1954)
Sonneurs de Basse-Bretagne (1959)
Airs pour noce bretonne (1959)

Participations
Fest-noz Cadoudal (1975)
Souvenir de Bretagne Ya Breizh : Danses, Binious et Bombardes (1976)
En Bretagne: Noce bretonne et fest-noz
Chants et danses de Bretagne: l'Argoat

Singles
Dérobée du pays de Guingamp - polka piked - dans tro plin - dans fisel (1957)
À travers le pays breton (1959)
Heloise et Abellard - Gwerz an anon - suite de dans plin
Suite Dans plinn

References

1929 births
2021 deaths
Breton musicians
People from Côtes-d'Armor